The Geelong Oil Refinery is an oil refinery owned and operated by Viva Energy in Corio near Geelong in the Australian state of Victoria. In 2017, it was Australia's second-largest oil refinery, able to process 7.5 billion litres of crude oil per year.

The Geelong refinery was established by Shell Australia in 1954. It was sold to global oil trader Vitol, which established Viva Energy to buy all of Shell's Australian downstream assets in August 2014.

In 2021, Geelong Refinery became one of only two oil refineries in Australia (with Lytton Oil Refinery in Brisbane) that had not closed or announced closure within the year.

References

Buildings and structures in Geelong
Industrial buildings completed in 1954
Industrial buildings in Victoria (Australia)
Oil refineries in Australia
1954 establishments in Australia